The  Ua Huka rail (Gallirallus gracilitibia) is an extinct species of flightless bird in the Rallidae, or rail family.

History
It was described in 2007 from subfossil remains collected in 1965 by anthropologist Yosihiko H. Sinoto and colleagues at the Hane Dune archaeological site, on the island of Ua Huka in the Marquesas Islands of French Polynesia.  The site dates to about 1350 yr BP, from the early period of human settlement of the island.

Etymology
The specific epithet comes from the Latin gracilis (slender) and tibia (shinbone), referring to a diagnostic character of the material from which the species was described.

References

Ua Huka rail
†
Extinct flightless birds
Extinct birds of Oceania
Holocene extinctions
Late Quaternary prehistoric birds
Fossil taxa described in 2007
Ua Huka rail